Luis Oswaldo Castro Montero (born April 5, 1973) is a Venezuelan-British media entrepreneur based in London, and best known for his role as a director of the documentary Chávez, which was broadcast in several TV networks and awarded an Honorific Mention at the Havana Film Festival 2013.

He is a journalist with experience as a TV producer, presenter, director and head of Venispa Productions. His catalogue includes more than 200 productions, from TV documentaries, TV formats, news items and interviews broadcast by major international networks.

During his 20-year career he has travelled all over the world covering news, current affairs, business, eSports, art, and sports, from the UK to Venezuela, Colombia, Ecuador, Peru, Bolivia, Paraguay, Uruguay, Argentina, Brazil, Chile, Panama, Nicaragua, Costa Rica, Honduras, Guatemala, Cuba, Puerto Rico, Dominican Republic, México, Hawaii, USA, Spain, France, Iran and Russia among others.

Life and career

Luis Castro was born in Caracas, Venezuela, on the 5th of April 1973. He studied at Colegio La Salle La Colina and graduated in journalism and media from Universidad Central de Venezuela. 

In 2003 Luis Castro moved to London and continued his education in business, media and English.

Television
Luis created and produced a roundtable current affair TV series called Guayoyo, filmed in 12 countries in Latin America. and broadcast on the Iranian network HISPANTV.

He developed a docu-reality  for the British network GinxTV focusing this time on eSports personalities. The series is called IRL had two seasons running on GinxTV.In 2014 he developed a docu-reality TV format called "Fuera del Area" that focuses on the real lives inside football, while expanding the same concept to the adult movie industry with a series called “Not so Private” hosted by the famous adult stars couple Jasmine Jae and Ryan Ryder.

Since 2017 he is the host and producer of the Latin-American affairs round table programmes “Cartas sobre la Mesa” broadcasting on RT en Español in which Luis debates with prominent politicians, academics and experts.

Luis is also an Interviewer for RT en español in which he had the chance to talk to important personalities like former president of Panama Ricardo Martinelli, salsa legend Oscar D’ Leon, Dominican legend singer Johnny Ventura, as well as other celebrities.

Filmography

Awards
As a Documentary Director Luis Castro was awarded an "Honorable Mention of the Jury" at the 2013 Havana Film Festival for his film Chávez, a biography film on the life and death of the Venezuelan leader Hugo Chávez.

References

British television producers
Venezuelan television producers
Living people
Year of birth missing (living people)